Asterix and the Great Rescue is a video game released by Sega for the Genesis/Mega Drive in 1993 and for the Game Gear and Master System in 1994.

Plot
This game is based on the long-running, French comic book series Asterix the Gaul. The characters Asterix and Obelix must rescue Getafix (Panoramix) and Dogmatix (Idéfix) from the Romans, who are in the process of taking over Gaul.

Gameplay
It is a side-scrolling platform game. The startup screen offers a choice of difficulty level, as well as the ability to turn off the music and/or sound effects. The Master System and Game Gear versions allows changing characters during a level, whereas the Mega Drive/Genesis version removes this feature in favor of allowing choosing characters at the start of a level.

Reception
Reviewing the Genesis version, GamePro criticized the steep difficulty slope and poor controls, elaborating that "it's annoyingly easy to mix up the button for swapping special weapons with the button for using the special weapons. Even worse, the hard-to-control jumps become ... a big frustration when you need to jump precisely, but can't."[emphases in original] They nonetheless recommended the game to players who like tough puzzles.

Mean Machines gave a positive review of the Master System version which was described as "particularly entertaining" and "compulsive". The graphics were praised including the characters' resemblance to the original comic versions. The game was found to be lacking originality as it was so similar to previous titles featuring Disney characters, and sometimes frustrating but was judged to be "a great game".

The four reviewers of Electronic Gaming Monthly gave the Game Gear version a 5 out of 10, remarking that the graphics are well done the sounds are "a nuisance", and that the controls make the game excessively frustrating. GamePro similarly wrote that the Game Gear version's graphics and animation are good but that controlling the character is extremely difficult.

References

External links

1993 video games
Video games based on Asterix
Core Design games
Game Gear games
Platform games
Sega video games
Master System games
Sega Genesis games
Video games developed in the United Kingdom
Video games scored by Nathan McCree
Single-player video games